4000 series is an industry-standard family of integrated circuits.

4000 series may also refer to:

Japanese train types
 Meitetsu 4000 series electric multiple unit
 Odakyu 4000 series electric multiple unit
 Seibu 4000 series electric multiple unit
 Tokyu 4000 series electric multiple unit
 Yokohama Municipal Subway 4000 series electric multiple unit

Other uses
 Avaya ERS 4000 series, a series of Ethernet routers
 Avaya VSP 4000 series, a series of Ethernet routers
 Busan Transportation Corporation 4000 series people mover for the Busan Metro
 CTA 4000 series, a series of Chicago "El" rolling stock
 GEC 4000 series, a series of minicomputers
 HP LaserJet 4000 series, a series of printers
 International 4000 series, a series of trucks
 International 4000 series (1989), a series of trucks
 Port Authority 4000-series PCC, a series of streetcar
 Radeon HD 4000 series, a series of graphics processing unit
 Seoul Metro 4000 series, a series of Seoul Metro train.

See also

 4000 (disambiguation)